This Weimar Timeline charts the chronology of the Weimar Republic, dating the pre-history before the adoption of the actual Weimar constitution. This timeline stops when Hitler establishes the Third Reich.

The timeline is color-coded:
Black: Normal events of the Weimar republic and its pre-history.
Red: Events pertaining to Adolf Hitler.
Brown: Events regarding the German Workers' Party and the Nazi Party.
All other events pertaining to the rise of Nazism in Germany are emboldened.

For a chronology focusing on the rise of Nazism see Early Nazi Timeline.

End of the German Empire
28 July 1914 World War I breaks out.
14 April 1917 Government announces reduction in bread rations.
15 April 1917	200,000 Socialists and Communists stage major strikes in Germany
13 July 1917	Dr. Georg Michaelis replaces Theobald von Bethmann Hollweg as Chancellor of Germany.
31 October 1917 Michaelis resigns, replaced by Count Georg von Hertling

1918
4 October 1918	Prince Maximilian of Baden replaces Count Georg von Hertling as Chancellor of Germany
7 October – 3 November 1918	Naval mutinies (see German Revolution of 1918–19)
4–6 November 1918      Establishments of soviets across Germany.
4 November 1918	Sailors and worker's councils declare general strikes.
5 November 1918	3rd Squadron revolts.
7 November 1918	100,000 workers march on the Royal House of Wittelsbach. The King of Bavaria flees.
8 November 1918	All 22 of Germany's lesser kings, princes, grand dukes, and ruling dukes had been deposed.
9 November 1918     Proclamation of the Republic by Philipp Scheidemann, some hours later: proclamation of the Socialist Republic by Karl Liebknecht; also:
Matthias Erzberger arrives at Allied HQ at Compiegne.
Kaiser Wilhelm told to abdicate, before he can decide Prince Max formally announces the abdication of Wilhelm.
Social Democrats demand government from Prince Max.
Kaiser abdicates
Friedrich Ebert assumes the chancellery.  
First German Republic established.
11 November 1918	First World War ended.  Armistice signed with Allies.
Mid December, 1918	First Freikorps unit formed; Maercker Volunteer Rifles.
23 December 1918	Volksmarinedivision detained the government, surrounded the chancellery and occupied the phone exchange.
24 December 1918	Skirmish of the Berlin Schloss
30 December 1918	Spartakusbund splits from the Independent Socialists (later becomes the  KPD).

1919
January 1919	Independent Socialists and Spartacusbund stage large protests.  Large sections of Berlin seized. Also:
 "Free Workers' Committee for a fair Peace" renamed German Workers Party.
6  January 1919        Spartacists launch an armed revolt against the government (known as January uprising / Spartacist uprising) and were crushed
10 January 1919	Battle of Berlin begins; Counter-revolution
13 January 1919	Battle of Berlin finished.
January 1919	Bremen seized. Also:
German Gov. moved to the city of Weimar.
15 January 1919        Rosa Luxemburg and Karl Liebknecht murdered by Freikorps
6 February 1919	Fritz Ebert opens the Reichstag in Weimar, Germany.
11 February 1919    	Friedrich Ebert (SPD) leaves office. Also:
Philipp Scheidemann appointed chancellor.
21 February 1919	Kurt Eisner assassinated. Also: 
Attempted assassination of Erhard Auer.
3 March 1919	2nd Battle for Berlin; Communists seize Berlin; Weimar government appoints Gustav Noske as German defense minister. 
7 March 1919	Communist Strike Committee withdraws proclamation and makes peace overtures to government.
10 March 1919	Gustav Noske orders Peoples' Naval Division disbanded. Battle for Berlin over.  
March 1919	 Adolf Hitler finishes job of guarding Russian prisoners.
6–7 April 1919	Bavaria declared a Soviet Republic.
14 April 1919	Freikorps suppress Communists in Dresden.
18 April 1919	Freikorps suppress Communists in Brunswick. Also:
Battle of the Bavarian governments at Dachau. Communists defeat republican forces.
27 April 1919	Battle for Munich between Communists and Freikorps units.
29 April 1919	German representatives arrive in Paris.
1 May 1919	Communist defences at Munich breached.
2 May 1919	City of Munich taken; not declared secure until May 6; approximately 1200 Communists killed.
7 May 1919 German Delegation presented with the terms of the Treaty Of Versailles 
10 May 1919	Freikorps suppress communists in Leipzig.
18 June 1919   Germany given ultimatum to sign Treaty of Versailles
21 June 1919   Philipp Scheidemann (SPD) leaves office
22 June 1919	German Reichstag ratify the Versailles Treaty.
28 June 1919	Versailles Treaty signed in the Hall of Mirrors.

Weimar Republic
11 August 1919	The Weimar Constitution is announced.
11 September 1919	 Adolf Hitler sent as Vertrauensmann to infiltrate the German Workers' Party.

1920
January 1920	 The DAP grew to 190 members.
4 February 1920	Allies demand 900 Germans be handed over for war crimes.
20 February 1920	 DAP changes name to National Socialist German Workers’ Party.
February 1920	Inter-Allied Control Commission order 2/3 of Freikorps disbanded.
24 February 1920	 First public meeting of the NSDAP.
13 March 1920	Kapp Putsch
14 March 1920	Communists seize demilitarized Ruhr; Dortmund, Remscheid, Hagen, Mülheim, Düsseldorf; 300 people killed (mostly policemen).
17 March 1920	Kapp Putsch ends.
27 March 1920	Gustav Bauer (SPD) leaves office
31 March 1920	 Adolf Hitler mustered out of the military.
3 April 1920	21 different Freikorps units, under the command of General Baron Oskar von Watter, annihilate the Ruhr Communist uprising in five days; thousands killed.
April 1920	Government stops paying Freikorps units.
10 May 1920	Dr. Joseph Wirth and Walther Rathenau announce their "Policy of Fulfillment"; not received well by nationalist groups.
21 June 1920	Hermann Mueller (SPD) leaves office
11 August 1920	National Disarmament Law takes effect; disbanded civil guards
17 December 1920  	 NSDAP buys its first paper, the Voelkischer Beobachter.
December 1920	 NSDAP total party membership comes to 2,000.

1921
21 March 1921	Plebiscite in Upper Silesia.  They vote to remain part of Germany.
March, 1921	Allied Plebiscite Commission draws boundary based on plebiscite results, giving about 30% (1255/4265 square miles) of Upper Silesia to Poland. Large minority populations exist on both side of the boundary.
27 April 1921	Allied Reparations Committee levels 33 billion dollars worth of war reparations debt onto Germany; commands the handing over of 26% of all exports for 42 years and puts the Germans immediately into 12 billion in arrears.
3 May 1921	Polish insurgents under Wojciech Korfanty rise up in Upper Silesia.
5 May 1921    London Ultimatum which set the total sum of the war indemnity at 132 billion marks.
10 May 1921	Constantin Fehrenbach (Center) leaves office
23 May 1921	German Freikorps smash Polish forces at St. Annaberg.
24 May 1921	Under Allied pressure, all Freikorps units outlawed.
11 July 1921	 Adolf Hitler resigns from the party to force the hand of Anton Drexler not to unite with the DSP.
25 July 1921	 Adolf Hitler rejoins the party.
29 July 1921	 Adolf Hitler assumes leadership of the NSDAP.  He becomes "Der Fuehrer". 
26 August 1921	Matthias Erzberger, (finance minister of 1920) gunned down by OC killers
17 September 1921	 Hitler and SA disrupt speech by Otto Ballestedt of the Bayernbund; beaten badly; Hitler with others arrested. 
26 October 1921	Dr. Joseph Wirth (Center) forms 2nd cabinet

1922
12 January 1922	 Adolf Hitler sentenced to eight months.  
24 June 1922	 Hitler Incarcerated. Also:
Walther Rathenau assassinated.
German mark was 272 to 1 American dollar
27 July 1922	 Hitler released.
July 1922	670 marks = 1 US dollar 
August 1922	2,000 marks = 1 US dollar
27 October 1922   Benito Mussolini establishes his Fascist dictatorship in Italy. 
October 1922	45,000 marks = 1 US dollar
22 November 1922 	Dr. Wirth   leaves office
November 1922	100,000 marks = 1 US dollar
27 December 1922	France and Belgium occupy the Ruhr to ensure payment of war reparations in kind. The Weimar government responds by funding 'passive resistance' of the workers through printing Papiermarks, further fueling hyperinflation.
30 December 1922	500,000 marks = 1 US dollar

1923
February 1923	Reichsbank buys back Papiermark; stabilizes value at 20,000 to 1 US dollar
May 4, 1923	ℳ 40,000 = 1 US dollar
May 27, 1923   Albert Leo Schlageter, a German freebooter and saboteur, was executed by a French firing squad in the Ruhr. Hitler declared him a hero that the German nation was not worthy to possess.
June 1, 1923	ℳ 70,000 =1 US dollar
June 30, 1923	ℳ 150,000 = 1 US dollar
August 1-August 7, 1923	ℳ 3,500,000 = 1 US Dollar
August 13, 1923	Dr. Wilhelm Cuno (No party affiliation)    Leaves office
August 15, 1923	ℳ 4,000,000 = 1 US Dollar
September 1, 1923	ℳ 10,000,000 = 1 US Dollar
Around September 10 to September 25, 1923 Prices reportedly rise hourly in several German cities. 
September 24, 1923	Chancellor Stresemann ends the passive resistance in the Ruhr; infuriates the nationalists.
September 30, 1923	Major Fedor von Bock crushes a coup attempt by the Black Reichswehr. Also: 
ℳ 60,000,000 = 1 US Dollar
October 6, 1923	Dr. Gustav Stresemann (People's)  forms 2nd cabinet
October 20, 1923	General Alfred Mueller marches on Saxony to prevent a communist takeover. Also:
General Otto von Lossow in Bavaria is relieved of command by Berlin; he refuses.
October 23, 1923	Communist takeover of Hamburg
October 25, 1923	Hamburg Uprising suppressed
November 8, 1923	 Beer Hall Putsch
November 9, 1923	 Beer Hall Putsch quelled. 
November 12, 1923	Dr. Hjalmar Schacht was named Reichswaehrungskommissar.
November 15, 1923	Rentenmark issued, with value backed by mortgage payments on state property; Rentenmark 4.2 = 1 US dollar; at this time:
Papiermark 4,200,000,000 = 1 US dollar
November 30, 1923 	Dr. Stresemann leaves office.

1924
February 26, 1924	Hitlerputsch trial  begins.
June 3, 1924	Dr. Wilhelm Marx (Center) forms 2nd cabinet
August 29, 1924	Dawes Plan agreed by Reichstag.
December 20, 1924	 Hitler released from Landsberg Prison.

1925
January 4. 1925	 Hitler begins his political comeback by meeting with new ministers and President of Bavaria.
January 15, 1925	Dr. Marx leaves office.
February 27, 1925	 Nazi party refounded;  Hitler gives his first speech since release from prison.
February 28, 1925	Reichspresident Friedrich Ebert dies.
March 29, 1925         First round of presidential elections: no candidate receives absolute majority.
April 25, 1925         Second round of presidential elections: Paul von Hindenburg, the candidate of the right wing parties, wins over Wilhelm Marx, candidate of the Centre party
July 1925	French and Belgian troops evacuate the Ruhr completely.
November 22, 1925	 Strasser wing of Nazi party goes into rebellion.
October 5–16, 1925	Locarno Treaties negotiated.
December 1, 1925 Locarno Treaties signed.

1926
January 20, 1926	Dr. Hans Luther (No party affiliation) forms 2nd cabinet
February 14, 1926	Bamberg conference begins.
April 24, 1926	Germany and Soviet Union sign Berlin Treaty.
May 12, 1926	Dr. Luther leaves office over flag dispute
May 16, 1926	Marx cabinet of the Center, BVP, DDP, DVP.
June 20, 1926	Referendum on expropriation of princely families.
September 8, 1926	 Germany admitted to the League of Nations

1927
January 29, 1927	Marx's 3rd cabinet  leaves office
July 16, 1927	Unemployment Insurance Law passed.

1928
May 1928	 Adolf Hitler speaking ban lifted in Bavaria.
29 June 1928	Marx's 4th cabinet leaves office
27 August 1928 Kellogg–Briand Pact signed
20 October 1928	Alfred Hugenberg becomes head of DNVP
8 December 1928	Prelate Kaas becomes head of Center party.

1929
7 June 1929	Young Plan resets reparations amount, and allows it to be paid in installations over a period of 58.5 years.
3 October 1929	Foreign minister Gustav Stresemann dies.
24 October 1929	Black Tuesday stock market crash, start of world economic collapse.
22 December 1929	Liberty Law referendum to reject Young Plan fails due to extremely low turnout (14.9–50% was required for it to be valid.)

1930
30 March 1930	Hermann Mueller's (SPD) 2nd cabinet leaves office	
30 June 1930	French troops leave the Rhineland ahead of schedule.
16 July 1930	Reichstag dissolved; first emergency decree by Reichspresident.
August 1930	 SA commander in Berlin Walter Stennes calls for SA general strike against Nazi Party.
14 September 1930	Reichstag elections; gains by NSDAP who become the second-largest party (behind the SPD.)
September 1930	 Hitler at trial of 3 SA Lieutenants disavows the SA goals of replacing the army and hence appeases the German army.

1931
11 May 1931	Austrian Kreditanstalt collapses
May 1931	Four million unemployed in Germany.
20 June 1931	Herbert Hoover puts moratorium on reparations.
13 July 1931	German bank crisis.
11 October 1931	Harzburg Front formed of coalition between DNVP, Stahlhelm, and Nazi Party

1932
10 April 1932	Paul von Hindenburg reelected President of Germany.
30 May 1932	Henrich Bruening (Center) leaves office.
1 June 1932	Franz von Papen cabinet
16 June – 9 July 1932	Lausanne conference
20 July 1932	Von Papen dissolves Prussian government.
31 July 1932	Reichstag elections where Nazi party becomes the largest party.
6 November 1932	Reichstag elections; Nazis lose votes. 
17 November 1932	Franz von Papen (Center) leaves office
3 December 1932	Kurt von Schleicher cabinet

1933
28 January 1933	Kurt von Schleicher (no party affiliation) leaves office
30 January 1933	 Adolf Hitler is sworn in as Chancellor of Germany.
23 March 1933	         Adolf Hitler establishes the Third Reich  (Enabling Act of 1933).

See also
Weimar culture
Weimar political parties
Glossary of the Weimar Republic

References
 Halperin, S. William. Germany Tried Democracy: A Political History of the Reich from 1918 to 1933 (1946) online.

Why Hitler, The Genesis of the Nazi Reich, Samuel W. Mitcham, Praeger,  Westport, CT, 1996. pg 28.
The Logic of Evil, The Social Origins of the Nazi Party, 1925-1933, William Brustein, Yale University Press, New Haven, CT. 1996.  pp 191–193.

Related media
 Audio: Educational rapsong about The Weimar Republic by Johnathan Pagel,  OGG format (2,14Mb) MP3 (4.33Mb)

.
Weimar Republic
Weimar Republic